Ghatwali was a feudal tenure/jagir for quasi-military services, only found in the district of Santhal Parganas and some parts of Munger. The ruling chiefs of these jagir were known as Ghatwals. They were responsible for maintaining safety, security, and law enforcement in their estate using a force of archers and Berkandazes. The Deoghar subdivision consisted of 53 Ghatwalis among which the largest were Rohini, Pathrol, Baman-ganwa, Kukraha, Garsara, Teor and Burhe. The Deoghar ghatwali were formed under the Birbhum Raj in the 18th century to defend against the invasion of Marathas and neighbouring rulers. Kharna estate was another prominent ghatwali in Kharagpur Raj. The  Kharagdiha gadis were earlier on ghatwali tenure, but when Captain Cammec found these Malik of the gadis prominent in their country, these gadis were permanently settled slowly after 1793. The ghatwals of Kharagdiha became the Zamindars and Rulers of their respective estates. Some of the prominent Khargdiha gadis were Gadi Palganj, Koderma, Goranjee, Gadi Ledo and Gadi Sirsia.

Mulraiyati was another feudal tenure for revenue collection found in the district of Santhal Parganas. A Mulraiyat is a settlement holder whose rights are transferable and attachable. The tenure in its special form arose in 1877. It is peculiar to the Deoghar subdivision alone in the Santhal Parganas. The name "mul raiyat" was a term invented in 1877, during the Ashley Eden's government (later K.C.S.I). The mulraiyats have been used interchangeably with pradhans and mustajirs as they collected rent from ordinary raiyats as intermediaries, but the mulraiyats enjoyed superior rights and privileges on their estates.

Both Ghatwali and Mulraiyati estates historically passed from father to firstborn son (primogeniture). Along with Zamindars, these tenure holders formed the Aristocracy of Bihar. Ghatwali tenure was abolished in 1952 along with Zamindari.

See also
Zamindars of Bihar
Zamindars
Jagirdars
Indian Feudalism
Aristocracy

References

Mughal Empire
Titles in India
Indian feudalism
Zamindari estates
Jagirs